A saw is an old saying or commonly repeated phrase or idea; a conventional wisdom.  While "old saw" is a common phrase for "saw", some consider it a tautology.

Among various synonyms for "saying", dictionaries from 18th century singled out "saw" as a vulgar, uneducated wisdom, often based in superstitions. This flavor is seen in the expressions "old women's saws" and "old wife's saws".

See also
Aphorism
Folklore
Maxim (philosophy)
Old wives' tale
Proverb

References

Phrases